David Robert Murray (born 30 September 1967) is an English former footballer.

Murray made six appearances in the Football League for Chester City during 1985–86, after earlier spells at Chorley and Wigan Athletic. He scored in a 2–2 draw at Northampton Town and also found the net for the Blues in a League Cup tie at Coventry City.

Murray did not play for Chester again after they were promoted at the end of the season and he dropped into non-League football with Witton Albion.

Bibliography

References

1967 births
Living people
Sportspeople from Chorley
Association football forwards
English footballers
English Football League players
Wigan Athletic F.C. players
Chester City F.C. players
Witton Albion F.C. players